The 1985 season of the Tongatapu Inter Club Championship was the 12th season of top flight association football competition in Tonga. Ngeleʻia FC won the championship for the fourth time, their fourth title in a then-record of 7 consecutive championships.

Standings

References

Tonga Major League seasons
Tonga
Football